Dubé Settlement is an unincorporated community in Restigouche County, New Brunswick, which is located in the country of Canada.

History

Notable people

See also
List of communities in New Brunswick

References

Communities in Restigouche County, New Brunswick